Michael Constantine Diamond, OAM (born 20 May 1972) is a professional target shooter from Australia.

Career
Diamond was introduced to sport shooting at the age of eight by his father, Con, who was a sporting shooter and managed a gun club.

Mastering the shotgun, Diamond succeeded in winning the Olympic gold medal for trap consecutively in Atlanta in 1996 and Sydney in 2000, becoming the second men's trap shooter to have done so. He held the world record in double trap, and held the final world record in trap between 2007 and 2008. Diamond is of Greek heritage. In 1997, he changed his surname from Diamantopoulos to Diamond.

Diamond won the trap event at the 2007 World Shotgun Championships. He was selected to compete in his sixth Olympic Games in London. At the end of the qualification period, he was leading with an Olympic record of 125/125, but ended up finishing fourth overall, losing to Fehaid Aldeehani of Kuwait in a bronze Medal shoot-out.

Diamond was ruled ineligible for nomination for the 2016 Rio Olympic games by the Australian Olympic Committee as his firearms licence had been suspended on grounds that were later rejected in court.

Olympic results

Personal life
Diamond was born in Goulburn, New South Wales. He is of Greek heritage. He married Cathy and together they had three daughters.

In 2016, Diamond was charged with firearms offences and drink driving following an alleged domestic dispute involving his brother. The charges resulted in the automatic suspension of his firearms licence under Australian law. Without a firearms licence, Diamond was ruled ineligible for nomination for the 2016 Rio Olympic games by the Australian Olympic Committee. A court later quashed these convictions on appeal, questioning the legality of the police search and rejected claims by the prosecution that the firearms were not kept safe.

References

1972 births
Living people
Australian male sport shooters
Trap and double trap shooters
World record holders in shooting
Olympic shooters of Australia
Olympic medalists in shooting
Olympic gold medalists for Australia
Shooters at the 1992 Summer Olympics
Shooters at the 1996 Summer Olympics
Shooters at the 2000 Summer Olympics
Shooters at the 2004 Summer Olympics
Shooters at the 2008 Summer Olympics
Shooters at the 2012 Summer Olympics
Medalists at the 1996 Summer Olympics
Medalists at the 2000 Summer Olympics
Commonwealth Games medallists in shooting
Commonwealth Games gold medallists for Australia
Commonwealth Games silver medallists for Australia
Shooters at the 1998 Commonwealth Games
Shooters at the 2002 Commonwealth Games
Shooters at the 2006 Commonwealth Games
Shooters at the 2014 Commonwealth Games
Sportspeople from Sydney
People from Goulburn
Australian people of Greek descent
Recipients of the Medal of the Order of Australia
Recipients of the Australian Sports Medal
Medallists at the 1998 Commonwealth Games
Medallists at the 2002 Commonwealth Games
Medallists at the 2006 Commonwealth Games